Rafael Barquero (born 27 June 1934) is a Costa Rican judoka. He competed in the men's middleweight event at the 1964 Summer Olympics.

References

1934 births
Living people
Costa Rican male judoka
Olympic judoka of Costa Rica
Judoka at the 1964 Summer Olympics
Sportspeople from San José, Costa Rica